"Dancing in the Storm" is a song by Australian band, Boom Crash Opera. The song was released in March 1990 as the fourth single from their second studio album, These Here Are Crazy Times! (1989). It was also covered by the Australian Country band The Sunny Cowgirls on their "My Old Man" album (2014)

In January 2018, as part of Triple M's "Ozzest 100", the 'most Australian' songs of all time, "Dancing in the Storm" was ranked number 51.

It was also used in the Australian movie The Big Steal.

Track listing
 "Dancing in the Storm" - 4:12
 "Mountain of Strength" - 4:09
 "Get Out of the House!" (Live) - 3:21
 "End Up Where I Started" (Live) - 3:34
 "Hands Up in the Air" (Live) - 5:26

 Live tracks recorded at MCM Network.

Charts

References

External links 
Boom Crash Opera website

1989 songs
1990 singles
Boom Crash Opera songs
Warner Music Australasia singles
Songs written by Richard Pleasance